Cecil Thompson may refer to:

 Tiny Thompson (Cecil Ralph Thompson, 1903–1981), Canadian professional ice hockey goaltender
 Cecil Thompson (RAF officer) (1894–1973), South African World War I flying ace
 C. V. R. Thompson (Cecil Victor Raymond Thompson, 1906-1951), UK journalist and author